Robert Trigges (by 1508 – 1550/1551), of St. Peter's, Chichester, Sussex and Chawton, Hampshire, was an English politician.

Trigges was a Member of Parliament for Chichester in 1529.

References

1550s deaths
People from Chichester
People from Chawton
English MPs 1529–1536
Year of birth uncertain